Various Failures is the eighth compilation album by American experimental rock band Swans.  It was released on March 22, 1999 and contains tracks from White Light from the Mouth of Infinity, Love of Life, The Burning World, and The World of Skin's Ten Songs for Another World. In addition, it contains B-sides, rarities, and previously unreleased tracks.

The album was re-released in 2000. The second disc of this edition dropped "Can't Find My Way Home", the Jarboe version of "Love Will Tear Us Apart" and the acoustic version of "New Mind".  "The Sound of Freedom" from Love of Life and "Saved" from The Burning World replaced the aforementioned tracks.

The only unreleased tracks featured on this compilation (besides some songs that have been faded in/out) are a longer version of "Why Are We Alive", an instrumental version of "The Most Unfortunate Lie" (listed on this album as "Unfortunate Lie") and a demo version of "When She Breathes". The acoustic version of "New Mind" and the Jarboe version of "Love Will Tear Us Apart" had never been previously available on CD.

Track listing

References

External links
Swans official website - Various Failures

1999 compilation albums
Swans (band) compilation albums
Young God Records compilation albums
Albums produced by Michael Gira